Habibur Rahman  (27 January 1942 – 6 May 2020) was a Bangladesh Awami League politician and a 4-term Jatiya Sangsad member representing the Dhaka-4 and Dhaka-5 constituencies.

Career
Mollah was elected to parliament from Dhaka-5 as a candidate of Bangladesh Awami League on 29 December 2009. He was released from jail after securing bail on a corruption case from Chief Justice MM Ruhul Amin in the Appellate Division of Bangladesh Supreme Court. Habibur Rahman Mollah and his childhood friend R.K Chowdhury, former Chief-Advisor of Dhaka Metropolitan Awami League did politics together for a long time. He was elected to parliament from Dhaka-5 as a candidate of Bangladesh Awami League in 2014.

Death 
Mollah died in office on 6 May 2020 in Square Hospital, Dhaka, Bangladesh.

References

1942 births
2020 deaths
Awami League politicians
7th Jatiya Sangsad members
9th Jatiya Sangsad members
10th Jatiya Sangsad members
11th Jatiya Sangsad members
Place of birth missing